Hindu Temples – What Happened to Them is a two-volume book by Sita Ram Goel, Arun Shourie, Harsh Narain, Jay Dubashi and Ram Swarup. The first volume was published in the Spring of 1990.

Contents 
The first volume includes a list of 2,000 mosques that he claims were built on Hindu temples, based primarily on the books of Muslim historians of the period or inscriptions found on mosques. The second volume excerpts from medieval histories and chronicles and from inscriptions concerning the destruction of Hindu,  Jain and Buddhist temples. The authors claim that the material presented in the book as "the tip of an iceberg".

The book contains chapters about the Ayodhya debate. The appendix of the first volume contains a list of temple-destructions and atrocities that the authors claim took place in Bangladesh in 1989. The book also criticizes "Marxist historians", and one of the appendices of the second volume includes a questionnaire for "Marxist professors", one of whom was the notable Indian historian Romila Thapar.

Reception

Cynthia Talbot, writing in 1995 about religious identities in pre-modern India, noted that since the late sixteenth century, temple desecration were indeed on the rise in Andhra Pradesh, which went in accord with Goel's list.

Goel's book also includes an exchange of comments between Romila Thapar and Goel. Romila Thapar has criticized Goel, claiming that he does not understand how to use historical sources.

See also
 Muslim conquests in the Indian subcontinent
 Conversion of non-Islamic places of worship into mosques
 The History of India, as Told by Its Own Historians (Book)

References

External links 
 Online version: 
---Volume 1 First Edition (There is also a second revised and enlarged edition. The online version is the first edition.)
---Volume 2 Second Enlarged Edition

1990 non-fiction books
History books about Hinduism
Books by Sita Ram Goel
Hinduism studies books
Hindu temples
Books critical of Islam
Anti-Hindu sentiment
Hinduism-related controversies
Hinduism and Islam
Collaborative non-fiction books
Religious buildings and structures converted into mosques